Gather Yourselves Together is an early novel by the science fiction author Philip K. Dick, written around 1948–1950, and published posthumously by WCS Books in 1994. As with many of his early books which were considered unsuitable for publication when they were first submitted as manuscripts, this was not science fiction, but rather a work of straight literary fiction. The manuscript was 481 pages in length. At the time it was published, it was one of only two Dick novels for which the manuscript was known to exist which remained unpublished. The other, Voices from the Street, was published in 2007.

Dwight Brown wrote the afterword. As of 2011, the original hardcover edition was out of print; in July 2012, Houghton Mifflin Harcourt released a trade paperback edition of Gather Yourselves Together, complete with Brown's afterword.

Plot summary
After the final victory of Mao Zedong's Chinese Communists in 1949, an American company prepares to abandon their Chinese operations, leaving three people behind to oversee transitional affairs - Carl Fitter, Verne Tildon, and Barbara Mahler. Verne and Barbara were previously involved with each other back in the United States, in 1945, when she lost her virginity to him. They have sex again, but Barbara has matured, and becomes more interested in Carl, who is younger than she is. Carl is more interested in reading his handwritten volume of personal philosophy to her, but Barbara does succeed in seducing him, shortly before the arrival of the Chinese.

Aspects of Gather Yourselves Together

Despite being an early, non-science fiction work, the book prefigures several staples of Dick's writing.
Carl keeps a notebook much like Dick's own 1970s Exegesis
There is a "dead-cat-as-indictment-for-being" story that is very similar to the one later used in VALIS.
The first "Dark Haired Girl" in any of Dick's novels appears in one of Carl's flashbacks.
"Teddy", one of Verne's past conquests, is likely a version of Dick's own imaginary sister of the same name.
The conclusion of the novel draws tenuous parallels between America and the late Roman Empire, and between the early Christians and communist Chinese.

Bibliography
Bibliography of Philip K. Dick

References

1994 American novels
Novels about communism
Fiction set in 1949
Novels by Philip K. Dick
Novels published posthumously
Novels set in China